José Casimiro Rondeau Pereyra (March 4, 1773 – November 18, 1844) was a general and politician in Argentina and Uruguay in the early 19th century.

Life and Politics
He was born in Buenos Aires but soon after his birth, the family moved to Montevideo, where he grew up and went to school. At the age of twenty, he joined the armed forces in Buenos Aires, but later transferred to a regiment in Montevideo. During the British invasion of 1806, he was captured and sent to England. After the defeat of the British troops, he was released and went to Spain, where he fought in the Napoleonic Wars. When he returned to Montevideo in August 1810, he joined the independentist forces and was nominated military leader of the independentist armies of the Banda Oriental, later Uruguay. His military successes in the various battles for Montevideo (including the Siege of Montevideo (1812–14)) won him the post of the military leader of the campaign in Peru, replacing José de San Martín, who had to resign due to health reasons.

In 1815, the Constituting General Assembly of the provinces of La Plata elected Rondeau their Supreme Director, but due to his absence, he never served as director. Ignacio Álvarez Thomas was named acting Supreme Director in his place. After two defeats against the Spanish royalist troops in Peru at Venta y Media and Sipe-Sipe, he was relieved from his command in 1816. He returned to Buenos Aires, where he became governor for a brief stint from June 5 to July 30, 1818. In 1819 he became Pueyrredón's successor as Supreme Director (serving this time), but had to resign the following year after the Battle of Cepeda.

Subsequently, Rondeau retreated to Montevideo and tried to keep out of the internal wars between competing generals of the independentists. Nevertheless, he led several military campaigns against the Indians and in the independence wars against Brazil. In 1828, after the Treaty of Montevideo, he was elected as the governor of the newly founded Eastern Republic of Uruguay. Rondeau occupied this post from December 22, 1828 until April 17, 1830, when he was forced to abdicate by his opponent Juan Antonio Lavalleja, who held the majority in the still young parliament. Lavalleja was named governor ad interim.

Rondeau still served as general in the army, though. In the civil war of Uruguay from 1836 between the Blancos ("White") and the Colorados ("Red"), he fought on the side of the latter and served as their war minister. He was killed in 1844 during the Great Siege of Montevideo.

See also
List of heads of state of Argentina
List of presidents of Uruguay

External links
Short biography (in Spanish).
Longer biography, also in Spanish.

1773 births
1844 deaths
People from Buenos Aires
Argentine people of French descent
Uruguayan independence activists
People of the Argentine War of Independence
Argentine generals
Governors of Buenos Aires Province
Supreme Directors of the United Provinces of the Río de la Plata
Foreign ministers of Argentina
Uruguayan politicians
Argentine military personnel killed in action
Defence ministers of Uruguay
Ambassadors of Uruguay to Argentina
19th-century Argentine military personnel
Burials at the Central Cemetery of Montevideo